C (C-sharp) is a musical note lying a chromatic semitone above C and a diatonic semitone below D; it is the second semitone of the solfège. C-sharp is thus enharmonic to D. It is the second semitone in the French solfège and is known there as do dièse. In some European notations, it is known as Cis. In equal temperament it is also enharmonic with B (B-double sharp/Hisis).

When calculated in equal temperament with a reference of A above middle C as 440 Hz, the frequency of C4 (the C above middle C) is about 277.183 Hz. See pitch (music) for a discussion of historical variations in frequency.

Designation by octave

Scales

Common scales beginning on C
 C major: C D E F G A B C
 C natural minor: C D E F G A B C
 C harmonic minor: C D E F G A B C
 C melodic minor ascending: C D E F G A B C
 C melodic minor descending: C B A G F E D C

Diatonic scales
 C Ionian: C D E F G A B C
 C Dorian: C D E F G A B C
 C Phrygian: C D E F G A B C
 C Lydian: C D E F G A B C
 C Mixolydian: C D E F G A B C
 C Aeolian: C D E F G A B C
 C Locrian: C D E F G A B C

Jazz melodic minor
 C ascending melodic minor: C D E F G A B C
 C Dorian ♭2: C D E F G A B C
 C Lydian augmented: C D E F G A B C
 C Lydian dominant: C D E F G A B C
 C Mixolydian ♭6: C D E F G A B C
 C Locrian ♮2: C D E F G A B C
 C Altered: C D E F G A B C

See also
 Piano key frequencies
 Root (chord)

Musical notes